Farman Behboud (1946 – March 2010) was an Iranian pianist and piano teacher.

He was born in Tehran and studied the piano at the Tehran Conservatory of Music under Emanuel Melik-Aslanian and Ophelia Kombadjian.

Behboud gave several recitals and concerts with the NIRT Chamber Orchestra. He was also the pianist of the Persian Ballets Organization in Tehran.

Behboud used to teach at the Tehran Conservatory.  Since the 1979 Iranian revolution he has preferred to teach private classes.

In recent years Behboud has held some recitals for his students in Tehran. Classical pianist, composer, and Ney player Rasool Akbari, renowned Canadian composer, conductor and strategist Joseph Lerner and Peyman Yazdanian were Farman Behboud's students.

References

1946 births
2010 deaths
Iranian pianists
Music educators
Piano pedagogues
Musicians from Tehran
20th-century pianists